Compulsive hoarding, also known as hoarding disorder, Plyushkin's disorder, is a mental disorder characterised by accumulation of possessions due to excessive acquisition of or difficulty discarding them, regardless of their actual value, leading to clinically significant distress or impairment  in personal, family, social, educational, occupational or other important areas of functioning. Excessive acquisition is characterized by repetitive urges or behaviours related to amassing or buying items. Difficulty discarding possessions is characterized by a perceived need to save items and distress associated with discarding them. Accumulation of possessions results in living spaces becoming cluttered to the point that their use or safety is compromised. It is recognised by the eleventh revision of the International Classification of Diseases (ICD-11) and the Diagnostic and Statistical Manual of Mental Disorders, 5th edition (DSM-5).

Prevalence rates are estimated at 2% to 5% in adults, though the condition typically manifests in childhood with symptoms worsening in advanced age, at which point collected items have grown excessive and family members who would otherwise help to maintain and control the levels of clutter have either died or moved away.

People with hoarding disorder commonly live with other complex and/or psychological disorders such as depression, anxiety, obsessive compulsive disorder (OCD) and attention deficit hyperactivity disorder (ADHD). Other factors often associated with hoarding include alcohol dependence and paranoid, schizotypal and avoidance traits.

Differential diagnosis

Collecting and hoarding may seem similar, but there are distinct characteristics that set the behaviors apart. Collecting is a hobby often involving the targeted search and acquisition of specific items that form—at least from the perspective of the collector—a greater appreciation, deeper understanding, or increased synergistic value when combined with other similar items. Hoarding, by contrast, typically appears haphazard and involves the overall acquiring of common items that would not be especially meaningful to the person who is gathering such items in large quantities. People who hoard commonly keep items that hold little to no true meaning or value to most others, unlike some collectors, whose items may be of great value to select people. Most hoarders are disorganized, and their living areas are crowded and in disarray. Most collectors can afford to store their items systematically or to have enough room to display their collections. Age, mental state, or finances have caused some collectors to fall into a hoarding state.

Clutter Image Rating 
A UK charity called HoardingUK, has found that people have very different ideas about what it means to have a cluttered home. For some, a small pile of things in the corner of an otherwise well-ordered room constitutes serious clutter. For others, only when the narrow pathways make it hard to get through a room does the clutter register. To ensure an accurate sense of a clutter problem, they created the Clutter Image Rating, a series of pictures of rooms in various stages of clutter – from completely clutter-free to very severely cluttered designed to encourage people to get support.

Studies 
In a 2010 study using data from self-reports of hoarding behavior from 751 participants, it was found most reported the onset of their hoarding symptoms between the ages of 11 and 20 years old, with 70% reporting the behaviors before the age of 21. Fewer than 4% of people reported the onset of their symptoms after the age of 40. The data showed that compulsive hoarding usually begins early, but often does not become more prominent until after age 40. Different reasons have been given for this, such as the effects of family presence earlier in life and limits on hoarding imposed by housing situation and lifestyle. The understanding of early onset hoarding behavior may help in the future to better distinguish hoarding behavior from "normal" childhood collecting behaviors.

A second key part of this study was to determine if stressful life events are linked to the onset of hoarding symptoms. Similar to self-harming, traumatized persons may create a problem for themselves in order to avoid their real anxiety or trauma. Facing their real issues may be too difficult for them, so they create an artificial problem (in their case, hoarding) and prefer to battle with it rather than determine, face, or do something about their real anxieties. Hoarders may suppress their psychological pain by hoarding. The study shows that adults who hoard report a greater lifetime incidence of having possessions taken by force, forced sexual activity as either an adult or a child, including forced sexual intercourse, and being physically handled roughly during childhood, thus proving traumatic events are positively correlated with the severity of hoarding. For each five years of life the participant would rate from 1 to 4, 4 being the most severe, the severity of their hoarding symptoms. Of the participants, 548 reported a chronic course, 159 an increasing course and 39 people, a decreasing course of illness. The incidents of increased hoarding behavior were usually correlated to five categories of stressful life events.

Although excessive acquiring is not a diagnostic criterion of hoarding, at least two-thirds of individuals with hoarding disorder excessively acquire possessions. Having a more anxiously attached interpersonal style is associated with more compulsive buying and greater acquisition of free items and these relationships are mediated by stronger distress intolerance and greater anthropomorphism. Anthropomorphism has been shown to increase both the sentimental value and perceived utility of items. These findings indicate that individuals may over-value their possessions to compensate for thwarted interpersonal needs. Feeling alone and/or disconnected from others may impair people's ability to tolerate distress and increase people's tendencies to see human-like qualities in objects. The humanness of items may increase their perceived value and individuals may acquire these valued objects to alleviate distress. Individuals with hoarding problems have been shown to have greater interpersonal problems than individuals who only excessively acquire possessions, which provides some support for the assumption that individuals with hoarding problems may have a stronger motivation to hang onto possessions for support. As possessions cannot provide support in the way humans can and because saving excessively can frustrate other people due to its impact on their quality of life, individuals with hoarding disorder may be caught in a feedback loop. They may save to alleviate distress, but this saving may cause distress, which may lead them to keep saving to alleviate the distress.

Treatment 
Only 5% of people with hoarding behaviours receive help (Singh, 2012) and the interventions they do receive focus on clearing items, not treating the disorder.

Cognitive-behavioral therapy (CBT) is a commonly implemented therapeutic intervention for compulsive hoarding. As part of cognitive behavior therapy, the therapist may help the patient to:
 Discover why one is compelled to hoard.
 Learn to organize possessions in order to decide what to discard.
 Develop decision-making skills.
 Declutter the home during in-home visits by a therapist or professional organizer.
 Gain and perform relaxation skills.
 Attend family and/or group therapy.
 Be open to trying psychiatric hospitalization if the hoarding is serious.
 Have periodic visits and consultations to keep a healthy lifestyle.

This modality of treatment usually involves exposure and response prevention to situations that cause anxiety and cognitive restructuring of beliefs related to hoarding. Furthermore, research has also shown that certain CBT protocols have been more effective in treatment than others. CBT programs that specifically address the motivation of the affected person, organization, acquiring new clutter, and removing current clutter from the home have shown promising results. This type of treatment typically involves in-home work with a therapist combined with between-session homework, the completion of which is associated with better treatment outcomes. Research on internet-based CBT treatments for the disorder (where participants have access to educational resources, cognitive strategies, and chat groups) has also shown promising results both in terms of short- and long-term recovery.

Other therapeutic approaches that have been found to be helpful:
 Motivational interviewing originated in addiction therapy. This method is significantly helpful when used in hoarding cases in which insight is poor and ambivalence to change is marked.
 Harm reduction rather than symptom reduction. Also borrowed from addiction therapy. The goal is to decrease the harmful implications of the behavior, rather than the hoarding behaviors.
 Group psychotherapy reduces social isolation and social anxiety and is cost-effective compared to one-on-one intervention. Group CBT tends to have similar outcomes to individual therapy. Although group treatment often does not include home sessions, experimental research suggests that treatment outcomes may be improved if home sessions are included. Individuals have been shown to discard more possessions when in a cluttered environment compared to a tidy environment. Indeed, a meta-analysis found that a greater number of home sessions improves CBT outcomes.

Individuals with hoarding behaviors are often described as having low motivation and poor compliance levels, and as being indecisive and procrastinators, which may frequently lead to premature termination (i.e., dropout) or low response to treatment. Therefore, it was suggested that future treatment approaches, and pharmacotherapy in particular, be directed to address the underlying mechanisms of cognitive impairments demonstrated by individuals with hoarding symptoms.

Mental health professionals frequently express frustration regarding hoarding cases, mostly due to premature termination and poor response to treatment. Patients are frequently described as indecisive, procrastinators, recalcitrant, and as having low or no motivation, which can explain why many interventions fail to accomplish significant results. To overcome this obstacle, some clinicians recommend accompanying individual therapy with home visits to help the clinician: 

Likewise, certain cases are assisted by professional organizers as well.

In popular culture 
Maguire, Emily: Love Objects (2021), Allen & Unwin, 
Hoarders - TV series
Hoarding: Buried Alive

See also 

Hoarders
 Alexander Kennedy Miller, hoarded about 30 Stutz automobiles (19061993)
 Collyer brothers, Homer Collyer (18811947) and Langley Collyer (18851947)
 Edmund Trebus (19182002), participated in TV documentary

References

Further reading 
 
 
  Article discussing the disorder and its relationship to OCD.

External links

 The ICD Clutter–Hoarding Scale
 Non-commercial compulsive hoarding forum
 HoardingUK